NASA's Solution for Enterprise-Wide Procurement (SEWP) is a United States Government-Wide Acquisition Contract (GWAC) authorized by the U.S. Office of Management and Budget (OMB) and managed by the National Aeronautics and Space Administration (NASA). 

All federal agencies, including the Department of Defense (DOD), and government contractors are able to purchase ICT and AV solutions (equipment and services) from SEWP-authorized resellers (known as "Contract Holders"). In FY20, SEWP processed more than 46,000 new orders, allocating more than $9 billion from 90 cabinet-level and independent agencies, commissions, boards and other Federal entities from over 1,300 sites around the world. Over 83% of FY20 spending through SEWP was secured by small business contracts. 

Washington Technology rated NASA SEWP as one of nine contracts in the Federal Government which have "changed how the government buys technology". The article declares SEWP to be the  "Gold Standard" in customer service and mentioned that SEWP assists industry as well as government users to ensure that the acquisition process flows smoothly. In Fiscal Year 2020, SEWP was the top-rated federal GWAC for IT purchases.

Role in Federal Procurement 
The SEWP Program Office manages a suite of government-wide ICT and AV products and services contracts that enable NASA and all Federal Agencies to achieve their missions and strategic initiatives by providing streamlined access to critical technologies and solutions. The Program provides best value for the Federal Government and American taxpayer through innovative procurement processes, premier customer service and outreach, acquisition insight, and partnership with Government entities and Industry.

History 
The SEWP acronym originally (1993) referred to "Scientific and Engineering Workstation Procurement". In 2007, the full name was changed to "Solutions for Enterprise-Wide Procurement", pronounced 'soup', which allowed the same acronym to be maintained. NASA SEWP provides a wide array of ICT and AV products as well as product related services dealing with Information Technology & Computer Networking, Software & Cloud Computing, Wireless & Mobile Technology, Supporting Technology, AV/Conferencing technology and solutions, and a variety of services from planning and installation, engineering and training, and IT consulting and system design.  A full scope of products and services are found on the organization's website. 

As of 2020, the contract offered more than 3 million products, services, and solutions from more than 8000 manufacturers.

NASA SEWP was the first GWAC in the Federal Acquisition arena and the original contract was awarded in 1993. SEWP II was award in 1996, SEWP III in 2001, SEWP IV in May 2007  and SEWP V in May 2015.

Initially (1993) the contract provided technical and engineering related ICT and AV products but associated services were not included. As the technology sector and the contracts evolved, firm fixed-price services became available through the contracts. Thus, the acronym definition was changed in 2007 to Solutions for Enterprise Wide Procurement.  SEWP's mascot is a rubber duck floating in a bowl of soup, signifying the organization's intention to make procurement "as easy as duck soup".

References 

NASA
Government procurement in the United States
Federal government of the United States